Doo-Whop is a song written by Annerley Gordon, Alle Benassi, Daniela Galli, Marco Benassi, and Paul Sears, and recorded by Danish singer Whigfield. It was released in 2000 as the second single from Whigfield III

Track listing

CD single – Canada
 Doo-Whop (ABM original edit)  3:26
 Doo-Whop (ABM extended)       5:09
 Doo-Whop (Rivaz Tune Club)    5:50
 Doo-Whop (G.Side extended)    5:05
Bonus cuts
 Gimme Gimme (original Vox radio)  4:07
 Gimme Gimme (original Vox extended) 6:19

Notes
Mastered At OFF LIMITS Rec.Studios
Licensed From Energy Production Srl.
"Doo-Whop" published by Off Limits / Energy Prod.
"Gimme Gimme" published by SFR Music / B. Mikilski Publishing.
All tracks ℗ 2000 Energy Productions Srl., courtesy of Popular Records Inc, under exclusive license.
℗&© 2000 Popular Records Inc. Manufactured and marketed by Popular Records Inc. Made in Canada.

Charts

References

External links
 
 
 
 

2000 singles
1999 songs
Whigfield songs
Songs written by Ann Lee (singer)
Songs written by Alle Benassi
Songs written by Benny Benassi
Song recordings produced by Alle Benassi
Song recordings produced by Benny Benassi
ZYX Music singles
Songs written by Dhany